Ézy-sur-Eure (literally Ézy on Eure) is a commune in the Eure department in the Normandy region in northern France.

Population

See also
Communes of the Eure department

References

External links

Official site

Communes of Eure
Eure communes articles needing translation from French Wikipedia